Remni is a rural locality (a village) in Aserkhovskoye Rural Settlement, Sobinsky District, Vladimir Oblast, Russia. The population was 5 as of 2010. There are 2 streets.

Geography 
Remni is located 18 km east of Sobinka (the district's administrative centre) by road. Meshchera is the nearest rural locality.

References 

Rural localities in Sobinsky District